MS Cape Flattery was a United States Maritime Commission type C1-B cargo ship built in 1940–41 by the Seattle-Tacoma Shipbuilding, Tacoma, Washington, for the commission to be assigned to the American Mail Line for transpacific service. After the United States entry into the war the ship was operated by the War Shipping Administration (WSA) through American Mail as agents. The ship, after about a year of operation, became a troop transport for the remainder of the war.

Troop ship operations were largely to the Southwest Pacific. In 1945 the ship transited the Indian Ocean, Suez and the Atlantic to Hampton Roads and New York. Subsequently, Cape Flattery operated to Europe and the islands of the Caribbean. Completing allocation to Army requirements, the ship was laid up in the Hudson River on 28 April 1946, until it was sold for scrapping on 23 November 1970.

Construction
Cape Flattery was laid down on 15 April 1940 by the Seattle-Tacoma Shipbuilding Corporation for the U.S. Maritime Commission (USMC) as USMC number 120, yard hull 2, as one of five C1-B motorships to be built at the yard. The ship was launched on 28 September 1940 with completion and delivery to the USMC on 29 May 1941. The ship was assigned U.S. Official Number 240634 and signal WFPP for operation under bareboat charter by the American Mail Line.

The five-hold ship had two full decks extending the length of the hull and a third extending to the machinery space. The five holds were served by sixteen electric-drive winches. Two four-cylinder,  Westinghouse diesels drove General Electric  generators for electric power.

Operations
The ship was operated by the War Shipping Administration through American Mail as its agent under a General Agency Agreement through the war. Troop and cargo voyages to the South West Pacific continued until January 1945 when the ship underwent major repairs before departing via Los Angeles for a voyage through the South West Pacific on to Calcutta, Colombo, Aden and Port Said and across the Atlantic to Hampton Roads and New York. After a trip to Britain, the ship operated from Florida to Jamaica until a final trip from New York to Marseilles and return on 25 December 1945.

On 29 April 1946, Cape Flattery was placed in the Maritime Commission Hudson River Reserve Fleet. The ship remained there until it was sold on 23 November 1970, as one of five ships sold to Aguilar y Peris, S.L., Valencia, Spain for $535,500 as scrap. The ship was delivered from the reserve fleet to the company on 9 April 1971.

Footnotes

References

1940 ships
Ships built in Tacoma, Washington
Type C1-B ships
World War II merchant ships of the United States
Troop ships of the War Shipping Administration